Herbert Ulrich (14 September 1921 – 23 May 2002) was an Austrian ice hockey player. He competed in the men's tournament at the 1948 Winter Olympics.

References

External links
 

1921 births
2002 deaths
Austrian ice hockey players
Ice hockey people from Vienna
Ice hockey players at the 1948 Winter Olympics
Olympic ice hockey players of Austria